A Sikh War may mean:

The Mughal-Sikh Wars
The Afghan–Sikh Wars
The Gurkha-Sikh War (1809)
The Sino-Sikh War (1841-1842)
The First Anglo-Sikh War (1845–1846)
The Second Anglo-Sikh War (1848–1849)

The Sikh Empire dissolved after 1849.

 01
Battles involving the Sikhs
Military history of British India
Sikh Empire
1840s in India